Allophroides is a genus of the parasitic wasp family Ichneumonidae. The type species is Allophroides boops.

Species
 Allophroides acutatus Khalaim, 2007
 Allophroides boops (Gravenhorst, 1829)
 Allophroides flavilabris Horstmann, 2013
 Allophroides granulatus Horstmann, 2013
 Allophroides laevipleuris Horstmann, 2013
 Allophroides obscurus Horstmann, 2013
 Allophroides platyurus (Strobl, 1904)
 Allophroides rufifemur Horstmann, 1971
 Allophroides rufobasalis Horstmann et Kolarov, 1988
 Allophroides salicicola Horstmann, 2013
 Allophroides tenuicauda Horstmann, 2013
 Allophroides ungularis (Horstmann, 1981)

References

External links
Species List

Ichneumonidae genera